Round Lidingö Race, is a one course sailboat race, counter clockwise round Lidingö Municipality in the inner part of Stockholm archipelago arranged by Lidingö Segelsällskap, and is held annually the second Saturday in May, the first one being held in 1949.

Background
The course of the Round Lidingö Race is about 13,5 M. For many sailboats enthusiasts, the race sets the starting point for the sailing season in the Baltic Sea. Usually a couple of extreme racing yachts participate to make the final adjustments for the events to come later on, such as the Round Gotland Race and to increase the general public interest for sailing races, but most of all, a good opportunity to expose the sponsors trademarks. The number of participating boats is about 400–450, most of them with standard family yachts.

2009 event
In the 2009 race, two extreme boats participated; one Trimaran, type open OMRA 60 and one Super Maxi 100. Fastest boats without regard to LYS. Winds: average West 8- max. 12 m/s:
Catamaran, type Formula 18, helmsman Pontus Johansson, club Royal Swedish Yacht Club, time: 1 h 27 min.
Trimaran, type open ORMA 60, Spirit of Titan, helmsman Ulf Bowallius, club DJSK, time: 1 h 28 min.
Monohull, type Super Maxi 100, Hyundai, helmsman Bertil Söderberg, club Royal Swedish Yacht Club, time: 1 h 37 min.

A family cruiser like Albin Express, average: 2h 30 min.

Image gallery

Sources
LSS (Lidingö Sailboat Club), club presentation page 11, PDF-file (Swedish only)
Website LSS (Lidingö Sailboat Club), links Kappseglingar ->Lidingö Runt->Seglingsföreskrifter (Swedish only)

1949 establishments in Sweden
May sporting events
Recurring sporting events established in 1949
Sweden
Sport in Stockholm
Stockholm archipelago